Sacaca is a village located in the Potosí Department of Bolivia. It is the capital of the Sacaca Canton, Sacaca Municipality and Alonso de Ibáñez Province.

References 

Populated places in Potosí Department